The Theodore Roosevelt Memorial Bridge is a steel bridge located in Troy, Montana, USA. It was listed on the National Register of Historic Places on December 27, 2006.

It crosses the Kootenai River at Riverside Drive. Its spans rise .

References

Registration document

Road bridges on the National Register of Historic Places in Montana
Bridges completed in 1912
1912 establishments in Montana
National Register of Historic Places in Lincoln County, Montana
Steel bridges in the United States
Bridges over the Kootenay River